Blondshell is an indie rock project by American musician Sabrina Teitelbaum, based in Los Angeles, California. Following an early pop-leaning career under the name BAUM, Teitelbaum debuted Blondshell in June 2022 with the single "Olympus". She has toured with Suki Waterhouse, and a self-titled debut album is set for release on April 7, 2023 via Partisan Records.

History
After initially finding success with more pop-focused music under the name BAUM, Teitelbaum began writing more rock-centric music during the COVID-19 pandemic. She debuted as Blondshell in June 2022 with the single "Olympus". This was followed by the singles "Kiss City" in July and "Sepsis" in August. Teitelbaum signed to Partisan Records in December 2022 and simultaneously released another single, "Veronica Mars". Her debut self-album as Blondshell was announced for release on April 7, 2023 via Partisan. She toured with Suki Waterhouse in early 2023, including stops at South by Southwest and Los Angeles' El Rey Theatre and The Fonda Theatre, and is scheduled to join the 2023 Primavera Sound festival in Madrid and Barcelona.

Teitelbaum has been profiled in Rolling Stone, Nylon, The Guardian, NME, and The Los Angeles Times. She was named as one of BrooklynVegan's "15 Artists to Watch in 2023".

Discography

Studio albums 

 Blondshell (2023, Partisan)

Singles

Music videos

References

External links 

 
 

Partisan Records artists
American indie rock musicians